This article describes the knockout stage of the 2019–20 Women's EHF Champions League.

On 25 March, the EHF announced that no matches will be played before June due to the coronavirus pandemic.

All matches were cancelled on 26 June 2020.

Qualified teams
The top four placed teams from each of the two main round groups advanced to the knockout stage.

Format
The first-placed team of each group will face the fourth-placed team, and the second-placed team will play against the third-placed team from the other group. After that a draw will be held to determine the pairings for the final four.

Quarterfinals
The European Handball Federation announced on 13 March 2020 that the quarter-finals matches will not be held as scheduled due to the ongoing developments in the spread of COVID-19 across Europe. The matches were rescheduled on 25 March. The matches were cancelled on 24 April 2020, although they might be played before the final four.

Overview

|}

Matches

Final four
The final four was scheduled to be held at the László Papp Budapest Sports Arena in Budapest, Hungary on 9 and 10 May 2020 but was later rescheduled to 5 and 6 September 2020. If the quarterfinals can't be played, the top-two teams of the main round groups will be playing in the final four.

Bracket

Semifinals

Third place game

Final

References

External links
Final4 Official website

knockout stage